Liam Santamaria is an Australian former professional basketball player who is a writer and broadcaster for the National Basketball League (NBL). He is a host of commentary show NBL Overtime.

Santamaria was born in Melbourne, Victoria, and aspired to play basketball since his childhood. He played for the Victoria Titans of the NBL as a development player during the 2001–02 season and averaged 1.6 points in 10 games. Santamaria played for the Diamond Valley Eagles of the Big V from 2005 to 2008.

Santamaria retired from playing in 2008. He desired to still be involved with basketball and began his writing career in 2013. Santamaria made his first appearance as a television commentator in 2015.

References

Year of birth missing (living people)
Living people
Australian men's basketball players
Australian sportswriters
Basketball announcers
Basketball players from Melbourne
Guards (basketball)
Victoria Titans players